Stuart Barclay (born 4 October 1949) is a former Australian rules footballer who played with Essendon in the Victorian Football League (VFL).

Recruited from Gisborne, Barclay was a member of the 1968 Essendon reserves premiership team. A defender, Barclay was used initially as a back pocket but became a half-back. He played 38 league games for Essendon, from 1969 to 1973, then accepted an offer to captain-coach Launceston club City-South, which competed in the Northern Tasmanian Football Association.

Barclay was runner-up in the Hec Smith Medal and led City-South to a premiership in 1974, the first of his four seasons as coach. While in Tasmania, Barclay also coached the state team.

From 1978 to 1981, Barclay played in Queensland for Windsor-Zillmere and also represented Queensland. He retired after playing in Windsor-Zillmere's 1981 premiership, which they won with a grand final win over Kedron.

References

1949 births
Australian rules footballers from Victoria (Australia)
Essendon Football Club players
Gisborne Football Club players
City-South Football Club players
City-South Football Club coaches
Zillmere Eagles Australian Football Club players
Living people